Echinoteuthis danae is a species of whip-lash squid. Known only from specimens of paralarvae, the species may be the juvenile form of Echinoteuthis atlantica.

References
Notes

Sources
Joubin, L. 1933. Notes préliminaires sur les Céphalopodes des croisières du Dana (1921-1922). 4e Partie. Annales de l'Institut Océanographique 13: 1-49.

External links

Tree of Life web project: Mastigoteuthis danae

Whip-lash squid
Molluscs described in 1933